Rahima Mondal is an Indian politician. She was elected to the West Bengal Legislative Assembly from Deganga as a member of the All India Trinamool Congress.

References

Living people
Year of birth missing (living people)
West Bengal MLAs 2021–2026
Trinamool Congress politicians from West Bengal
21st-century Indian politicians
21st-century Indian women politicians